The 2013–14 Sunfoil Series was a first-class cricket competition held in South Africa from 21 November 2013 to 6 April 2014. Cape Cobras retained their title, winning for the fourth time in total, after completing a victory in the final round against Lions by an innings and 165 runs.

Points table

References

External links
 Series home at ESPN Cricinfo

South African domestic cricket competitions
Sunfoil Series
2013–14 South African cricket season
Sunfoil Series